No.6880 Betton Grange  is a steam locomotive which is under construction as a "new-build" project, originally based on the Llangollen Railway in Denbighshire, Wales, then subsequently at Tyseley Locomotive Works. Described as "building the 81st Grange", the project started in 1998, and the locomotive was earlier expected to be operational by 2013, but subsequently by Autumn 2021. All of the original GWR 6800 Class Grange locomotives were withdrawn for scrap by the end of 1965; this project is a creation, from an assemblage of original GWR and newly manufactured components, of a member of this class.

History

The GWR locomotive standardisation policy pursued by G.J. Churchward envisaged a range of locomotive classes which would be suitable for the majority of duties, and yet which would share a small number of standard components. Amongst the designs suggested in 1901 was a 4-6-0 with  diameter coupled wheels, and the Standard No. 1 boiler. Although planned in 1901, none were built until 1936, by which time C.B. Collett was in charge at Swindon. He took the Churchward proposal, and modified the design of the cab and controls to the then current style.

The 4300 Class of 2-6-0 tender locomotives had been introduced in 1911, and by 1932 there were 342 in service. With train loads and hence weights rising, these smaller, older and less powerful locomotives were scheduled to be replaced by new 4-6-0 locomotives by the 1930s.

The Granges were effectively a smaller-wheeled version of the GWR Hall Class. The GWR also built a lighter version of the Granges, the GWR 7800 Class, known as the Manor Class, which had smaller boilers. Between 1936 and 1939, 100 of the 4300 Class were taken out of service, and stripped of their parts at Swindon Works. The initial plan was to rebuild 80 as the 6800 Grange Class, whilst the remaining 20 were of the 7800 Manor Class. It had eventually been intended to replace all of the 4300 Class in this way in three batches, with the next Grange due to be built No. 6880 Betton Grange, to be named after the manor house in the Shropshire hamlet of Betton Strange. However, the onset of Second World War stopped the programme.

The wheels, valve motion and tenders of the Grange were taken from the withdrawn engines, reconditioned and then used in the construction of the 100 new locomotives; with the components from one old locomotive spread amongst more than one of the new engines. This was done in order to make the cylinders level with the axles, but still allow the use of the old valve motion parts.

The 6800 Class had driving wheels of  diameter, four inches smaller than those of the Hall Class. However, as their cylinders were of the same size and the two classes shared the Swindon No. 1 boiler, the Grange had a tractive effort 1,600 lb greater than the Hall. Hence, with their power and mixed traffic characteristics, the Grange locomotives could handle most duties on the network. The British Railways power classification of the Grange Class was 5MT, its GWR power class was D and its route availability colour code was red. In service they were reliable performers.

The last of the Grange Class, No. 6872 Crawley Grange was withdrawn and scrapped in 1965, and none were preserved.

Background
Inspired by the success of the A1 Steam Locomotive Trust in building the LNER Peppercorn Class A1 60163 Tornado the Llangollen Railway Society explored the possibility of recreating a new build Grange from existing parts of various locomotives, utilising the "kit of standard bits" construction approach adopted by the GWR.

After the Beeching Axe, British Railways had sold many of its steam locomotives to a number of privately owned scrap yards, the most famous of which was Woodham Brothers in Barry Island, South Wales. Whilst many of the early locomotives that were recovered from Barry were complete, later examples lacked non-ferrous fittings, pipework and valve gear, and were at worst simply frames, wheels, and a rusty boiler. Purchasers faced the dilemma of restoring their locomotive using newly fabricated parts, or dismantling it and using the parts to restore other, more complete, examples.

The Grange project represents a third approach, by using parts from scrapped locomotives in a new-build project.

GWR 6880 Betton Grange Project

The 6880 Society (registered charity, no: 1100537) was formed in 1998, with the sole purpose of constructing an operational Grange Class steam locomotive. As the GWR rebuild programme stopped at the end of the first batch of 80 locomotives, assigning a putative name and number to the proposed locomotive was a relatively easy procedure. From GWR records, No. 6880 Betton Grange was the next locomotive scheduled to come off the assembly line at Swindon Works, hence the projected locomotive became known as "the 81st Grange."

The core of the society was formed by the group who had recovered from Barry the GWR 5101 Class Large Prairie No. 5199 and restored it to operation at Llangollen.

Both the main frames and the cab for No. 6880 were newly fabricated, with cutting commencing in September 2004. The cab was completed in time for the Crewe Works gathering in 2005.

In 2005 the society acquired the boiler from GWR 6959 "Modified Hall" Class No. 7927 Willington Hall. The frames and wheelsets from the bogie and tender from the Hall have been retained by Didcot Railway Centre to build a GWR 1000 County Class, another class of GWR locomotive which was not preserved. The society also acquired the spare tender frame from GWR 4900 Class 4936 Kinlet Hall.

In 2010 the society bought GWR 4900 Hall Class No. 5952 Cogan Hall from the Cambrian Railways Trust. The long-term aim is to fully restore this locomotive to operational condition, but in the short term the society have borrowed its bogie and tender for the Grange project, to speed the project to a successful conclusion.

Kit of bits
Frames: cut from new metal
Boiler: obtained from GWR 6959 "Modified Hall" Class No. 7927 Willington Hall (Currently paired with 5952's boiler as template to aid with manufacturing of parts for 6880's eventual boiler)
Driving wheels: The spare wheelsets for GWR 4300 Collett "Mogul" Class No. 7325, on long-term loan agreement from the Severn Valley Railway Society. These wheels were re-tyred at the South Devon Railway.
Front bogie: borrowed from GWR 4900 Class 5952 Cogan Hall; being restored at Williton works on the West Somerset Railway
Cylinders: casting and machining of a new pair of cylinders, estimated cost of £60,000
Tender: borrowed from GWR 4900 Class 5952 Cogan Hall, with later option to rebuild spare frame obtain from No. 4936 Kinlet Hall (Will use 3814's tender till own is completed)
Cab: cut from new metal

Project milestones

See also
Steam locomotives of the 21st century
LNER Peppercorn Class A1 60163 Tornado
LMS Patriot Class 5551 The Unknown Warrior
Pennsylvania Railroad 5550

References

External links

6880 website
Betton Grange project  at the Llangollen Railway
Steel Steam & Stars
Latest News

6880
6880
Llangollen Railway
Standard gauge steam locomotives of Great Britain
Individual locomotives of Great Britain
Steam locomotives of the 21st century